The women's 4x400 metres relay event  at the 2001 IAAF World Indoor Championships was held on March 11.

Results

Final

References
Results

400
4 × 400 metres relay at the World Athletics Indoor Championships
2001 in women's athletics